Tianjin is a municipality in China. It may also refer to entities associated with the municipality:

Schools
 Tianjin University, a national key public research university
 Tianjin International School, a private, international school in Hexi District, Tianjin
 International School of Tianjin, an international school in Jinnan District, Tianjin

Businesses
 Tianjin Airlines, based in Dongli District, Tianjin
 Tianjin FAW, an automobile company based in Tianjin, also a couple of car models produced by the company

Other uses
 Tianjin dialect, a Mandarin dialect spoken in Tianjin
 Tianjin railway station, the principal railway station of Tianjin
 Tianjin Open, a WTA tennis tournament
 Tianjin Provisional Government (1900–1902), a government formed during the Boxer Rebellion
 Tianjin (crater), a crater on the far side of the Moon

See also
 Tianjin Agricultural University
 Tianjin Medical University
 Tianjin Normal University, a public research university
 Tianjin University of Commerce
 Tianjin University of Finance and Economics
 Tianjin University of Science and Technology
 Tianjin University of Sport
 Tianjin Crafts and Arts Professional College
 Tianjin Air Cargo, a cargo airline